Keyport is an unincorporated community and census-designated place (CDP) in Kitsap County, Washington, United States. The community is located at the eastern terminus of State Route 308 on the Kitsap Peninsula. As of the 2010 census, the Keyport CDP had a total population of 554.

Keyport was named for Keyport, New Jersey, in 1896. Its nickname is "Torpedo Town USA". Situated on a small peninsula jutting into Liberty Bay near Poulsbo, it is the home of a small United States Navy depot tasked with ranging and repairing torpedoes for the US Navy and allies.

Keyport's only church, Keyport Bible Church, was established in the early 1900s and incorporated in 1926. The church's building was dedicated May 2, 1937, and has since added a number of classrooms and a multipurpose building.

Military bases 
From the earliest days (pre-World War I), the naval station had a number of names such as Pacific Torpedo Station and Naval Torpedo Station, until in the 1990s when the base was named the Naval Undersea Warfare Engineering Station (NUWES). The land the base sits on was originally a pig farm, which led to some interesting nicknames in the base's early years. As the Cold War drew to a close, a number of budget cuts, two RIFs and several Base Realignment and Closure (BRAC) actions caused Keyport's parent command in Newport, Rhode Island, to reserve the engineering function to itself, at least on paper, resulting in a name change to Naval Undersea Warfare Center - Division Keyport. One of many subsequent reorganizations resulted in another name change to Naval Sea Systems Command, Keyport (NAVSEA). Following the US Navy's current trend of aligning base names locally, the current station name is Naval Base Kitsap – Keyport, similar to the other facilities in Bremerton and Bangor. However, the tenant Commands remain as before (NAVSEA and NUWC). Keyport survived all these threats without closing its gates, but the civilian workforce at Keyport has fallen from about 3,500 personnel in 1990 to 1,348 in 2005.

Tourism 
There is also a boat dock operated by the local Port Authority. Kitsap County maintains a small county park on the beach just across SR-308 from the main gate.

The base sports a boat launch, a park, a large picnic area on a lagoon, and a number of hiking trails on "Radio Hill" used by base employees during lunch breaks.

Places to eat include the Keyport Mercantile & Diner and Casa Mexico.

Cleanup 
Like many American bases, the Navy base at Keyport is designated a Superfund site, with four areas requiring action due to chemical contamination, including the former landfill on the western edge of the installation with the potential to contaminate neighboring well water. The chemicals of concern are chlorinated aliphatic hydrocarbons (CAHs) and polychlorinated biphenyls (PCBs). Treatment for CAH hot spots in the landfill is by phytoremediation (growing poplar trees). Other treatments are the removal of PCB-contaminated sediments, upgrading the tide gate, upgrading and maintaining the landfill cover and conducting long-term monitoring.

Climate
This region experiences warm (but not hot) and dry summers, with no average monthly temperatures above 71.6 °F.  According to the Köppen Climate Classification system, Keyport has a warm-summer Mediterranean climate, abbreviated "Csb" on climate maps.

References

External links
NUWC-Keyport
Census Data
Yahoo Maps

Census-designated places in Washington (state)
Census-designated places in Kitsap County, Washington